The Cebu City Police Office (CCPO) is a division of the Philippine National Police (PNP) which has jurisdiction over Cebu City and is under Police Regional Office VII (Central Visayas). It is headquartered in Camp Sotero Cabahug.

, the current CCPO Director is Police Colonel Ireneo Dalogdog.

Stations 
CCPO has eleven police stations under it namely:
 Police Station 1 - Parian
 Police Station 2 - Osmeña Boulevard
 Police Station 3 - Waterfront Pier
 Police Station 4 - Mabolo
 Police Station 5 - Carbon Market
 Police Station 6 - Sawang Calero
 Police Station 7 - Poblacion Pardo
 Police Station 8 - Talamban
 Police Station 9 - Guadalupe
 Police Station 10 - Labangon
 Police Station 11 - Mambaling

List of City Directors 
Note: Term does not distinguish the date of appointment as officer in charge and formal designation as city director.

References

External links 
 
 Philippine National Police official website

Philippine National Police
Law enforcement in the Philippines